Hershey's Cookies 'n' Creme is a candy bar manufactured by The Hershey Company and first introduced in 1994.

Product variations 
Hershey's Cookies 'n' Creme is a flat, white crème candy bar containing small, uniformly-shaped cookie bits. The standard-sized bar has 12 rectangular blocks arranged in a 3X4 grid. The XL variant of the bar is thicker than the original and has 16 rectangular blocks arranged in a 4X4 grid. Similar Cookies 'n' Creme candies manufactured by Hershey were released as Hershey's Drops in 2010. In 2020, Hershey’s released new related candy bars in Canada: Strawberries ‘N’ Creme (a re-release from 2005) and Cookies ‘N’ Mint. In May 2020, Hershey released a Cookies ‘N’ Creme variation with a red, white and blue wrapper for the July 4th holiday and did the same for Independence Day in 2021. The packaging also changed from all-white to a cream color with blue accents on the side of the packaging. Hershey's Cookies 'n' Creme is one of the few Hershey's chocolates sold in the United Kingdom.

Recipe change 
In 2008, The Hershey Company changed the ingredients of some of its products in order to replace the relatively expensive cocoa butter with oil substitutes. As a result, the packaging no longer states that the bar contains white chocolate.

Ingredients 
The ingredients include sugar, vegetable oil (cocoa butter, palm oil, shea oil, and sunflower and/or safflower oil), nonfat milk, corn syrup solids, enriched wheat flour (flour, niacin, ferrous sulfate, thiamin mononitrate, riboflavin, and folic acid), milkfat, partially hydrogenated vegetable oil (soybean and/or cottonseed oil). It also contains 2% or less of: cocoa processed with alkali, whey (milk), chocolate, soy lecithin, high-fructose corn syrup, sodium bicarbonate, salt, natural and artificial flavor, tocopherols (to maintain freshness), PGPR, emulsifier, and caramel color.

Nutrition information

Certifications 
The Hershey's Cookies 'n' Creme candy bar is OU-D certified, indicating it is a Kosher Dairy product.

Cereal 

On July 5, 2013, Hershey's Cookies 'n' Creme cereal was released in the United States by General Mills.

See also 
 Cookies and cream

References

External links
Hershey's Cookies 'n' Creme product details from Hershey's site

 

The Hershey Company brands
Products introduced in 1994
Chocolate bars